Sir Frank Hubert Hollins, 3rd Baronet (31 October 1877 – 31 January 1963) was an English cricketer active from 1898 to 1927 who played for Lancashire. He was born in Bowness-on-Windermere and died in Paddington. He appeared in 35 first-class matches as a righthanded batsman. He scored 1,114 runs with a highest score of 114 and held 33 catches. He took three wickets with a best analysis of two for 39.

Hollins was the second son of Sir Frank Hollins, 1st Baronet, who was head of the cotton spinning company of Horrockses, Crewdson & Co. He was educated at Eton and Magdalen College, Oxford. During World War I he served with the Rifle Brigade in France. He succeeded to the baronetcy in 1938 on the death of his brother, who had no children. He also had no children and the baronetcy became extinct on his death.

Notes

1877 births
1963 deaths
English cricketers
Lancashire cricketers
Oxford University cricketers
Marylebone Cricket Club cricketers
People educated at Eton College
Alumni of Magdalen College, Oxford
Rifle Brigade officers
British Army personnel of World War I
Baronets in the Baronetage of the United Kingdom
Oxford University Authentics cricketers
A. J. Webbe's XI cricketers
People from Bowness-on-Windermere
R. A. Bennett's XI cricketers